Ame Pandu Ame (born 1 January 1963) is a Member of Parliament in the National Assembly of Tanzania.

References

1963 births
Living people
Members of the National Assembly (Tanzania)
Place of birth missing (living people)